Quedius fuliginosus is a beetle found in Britain and, possibly by traveling in dry ballast, North America. It is similar in appearance to Quedius curtipennis, which is a more common species, however, the eyes of fuliginosus are more convex and the basal antennal segments darker. The punctures on the elytra are slightly stronger in curtipennis.

References

Staphylininae
Beetles of Europe
Taxa named by Johann Ludwig Christian Gravenhorst
Beetles described in 1802